Mary Catherine Dorothy Corrigan  (née Hennessey; July 26, 1913 – March 20, 2010) was a Canadian politician.  She was the 38th Mayor of her hometown of Charlottetown, Prince Edward Island, and to date, the only female to hold that office.

Corrigan originally pursued a career as a nurse, but entered politics following the death of her husband, Dr. J. Ernest Corrigan. Her first public office was as an alderman in Charlottetown's Ward 2 prior to running for mayor of the city in 1968.

She was elected as the city's first female mayor in the fall of 1968. Corrigan served as mayor until 1972. She worked at the landmark Hotel Charlottetown after leaving city hall.

Dorothy Corrigan lived independently at her home until 2009. She died at the Garden Nursing Home in Charlottetown on March 20, 2010, at the age of 96. Her funeral was held at The Church of the Most Holy Redeemer in Charlottetown.

References

1913 births
2010 deaths
Mayors of Charlottetown
Women mayors of places in Prince Edward Island
20th-century Canadian women politicians
Members of the Order of Canada